Gyges can refer to:
 One of the Hecatoncheires from Greek mythology 
 King Gyges of Lydia 
 Ogyges
 Ring of Gyges